Bhai (meaning "brother" in Indic languages) may refer to:

 Bhai (1997 film), a Hindi film
 Bhai (2013 film), a Telugu-language film
 Bhai (TV series), a Pakistani drama serial
 Bhai (writer) (1935–2018), Surinamese poet

See also
 Bhai Bhai (disambiguation)
 Do Bhai (disambiguation)